Ravikampadu is a small village in the Kollur mandal of the Guntur district of  Andhra Pradesh, India.

Education 

The primary and secondary school education is imparted by government, aided and private schools, under the School Education Department of the state. The total number of students enrolled in primary and upper primary schools of the village are 178.

Zilla Parishad High School is the government run school in the village.

References 

Villages in Guntur district